The Helsinki School was a name introduced in an article by Boris Hohmeyer, Aufbruch im hohen Norden (Breakthrough in the Far North), in art Das Kunstmagazin in 2003. This was the first time it was used as a brand name to describe a selection of artists who had studied under adjunct professor Timothy Persons at the University of Art & Design in Espoo from the beginning of 1990s (since 2010 Aalto University, School of Arts, Design & Architecture). So far, with over a 180 international publications, the Helsinki School represents a collaborative approach, where students of photography, not only work together by presenting each other's works but, exhibit with their professors, mentors and former alumni in a joint effort to share in mutual contextual dialogue that uses the photographic process as a tool for thinking.

History
In the beginning of the 1990s the University of Art & Design Helsinki (since 2010 part of the new Aalto University), Finland, embarked upon an educational experiment that challenged and initiated new approaches in teaching and preparing soon to be MA graduates for their professional careers. Yrjö Sotamaa the then acting Rector of the University, envisioned a program that would offer as well as create a different set of measurements in how one would evaluate graduating MA students. Timothy Persons who had done his graduate studies in Southern California during the 1970's at the Claremont Graduate University, was a recipient of that Open Studio ideology that was being championed by John Baldessari at CalArts and its sister school in Claremont at the time. Persons through his Professional Studies Program, built upon this Southern California model, by taking the class out of the classroom and into the various international art venues as means for experimenting, teaching, referencing and experiencing the realities of what a professional career demanded. This was realised through the creation of a virtual gallery known as Gallery TaiK, now Persons Projects. By joining all these generations together, it became the vehicle used by the Helsinki School artists to present their works on an international level through its participation in art fairs, publications, Pop-Up exhibitions and museum shows. The gallery was established in 1995 in Helsinki, however, since 2005 its permanent exhibition space has been located in Berlin. Its primary responsibility is to prepare and guide the students in how to manage their professional life. To this day it is directed by adjunct Professor Timothy Persons and Asia Żak Persons.

The Helsinki School was based upon a Professional Studies program that was unique in how it used its academic platform to create an environment that blended its teachers, students and former graduates together in a contextual dialogue through group exhibitions, publications and the utilisation of the international art fairs as a means for teaching, referencing and presenting these artists' works to the international community. It is grounded on an approach that introduces the students in how to use criticism as a positive tool. This places the emphasis more on how to find solutions rather than the fear of making mistakes. As a world-leading university in the field of Art & Design, Aalto University School of Arts, Design & Architecture supports and encourages the use of contemporary pedagogical methods including collaborative knowledge building and co-design in which students may also teach and learn from each other through their shared experiences. A good example of this is in  internship programs in which selected students travel abroad to work in residencies, galleries and other professional platforms.

Characteristics
The Helsinki School follows other of two key photographic movements: The New American Color Photography which established color photography as an important artistic medium, beginning with the William Eggleston exhibition at the MoMA in New York in 1976. And the Düsseldorf School, which emerged in the late 1970s under the guidance of Bernd and Hilla Becher, followers of the 1920s German tradition of Neue Sachlichkeit (New Objectivity). Their students, Andreas Gursky, Candida Höfer, Thomas Ruff and Thomas Struth modified the approach by applying new technical possibilities and contemporary vision. These movements combined with the influence of the Icelandic minimalism and artists like Donald Judd, played a pivotal role in understanding the roots of the Helsinki School.

The Helsinki School's defining trait is the use of the photographic process as a tool for conceptual thinking."There is a clarity of vision that seems to come out of the late evening northern summer light. The conceptual base is lucidly presented. There is an honesty and sincerity behind the work that is rare to find among a group of artists, (…) the borderland discourse, which touches the very idea of identity. Many Helsinki School pictures bear signs of Finnish culture, unconscious or not, meanings related to nature and remoteness. This is quite natural in a country so sparsely populated. These photographs seem to be presentations of artists who sink with themselves. (...) Their photographs seem to be covering something, preferably hiding and hinting than saying anything direct. Yes, there is ambiguity, yes there is a Northern loneliness, but it speaks very directly. There is a sense of isolation in the way several of the artists express their identity. Instead of direct contact with somebody in the picture, photographs became full of landscapes, empty spaces, and figures somewhere in distance." - Alistair Hicks (2014)

Artists

The next generations include artists such as Jyrki Parantainen, Marjaana Kella, Joakim Eskildsen, Elina Brotherus, Aino Kannisto, Ola Kolehmainen, Sanna Kannisto, and Jari Silomäki.

Group exhibitions

2020
 Female Positions from the Helsinki School, 2020, Fotografisk Center, Copenhagen, Denmark
 The Helsinki School: The Nature of Being, 2020, Persons Projects, Berlin
 A Kiss Given by Time to Light, 2020, Persons Projects, Berlin
 Nurture, Nature, 2020, David Behning Galerie, Düsseldorf, Germany
 A Fresh Breeze from The North! Images of Nature in the Helsinki School, 2020, Kunsthalle St. Annen, Lübeck, Germany

2019
 Tree Time, 2019/20, Museo Nazionale della Montagna "Duca degli Abruzzi" CAI Torino, Italy
 Abstractions, 2019, Persons Projects, Berlin
 Power of the Image: The 7th China International Digital Photography Art Exhibition, 2019, Datong Festival, Lishui, China
 Grenzgang Fotokunst: 11. Wiesbadener Fototage 2019, 2019, Wiesbaden, Germany
 An der Nordkante. Der Mensch in der finnischen Gegenwartskunst, 2019, Stadtgalerie Kiel

2018
 Cyclic Repetitions, 2018/19, Gallery Taik Persons (now Persons Projects), Berlin
 Considering Finland, 2018/19, Kunstverein Ludwigshafen, Germany
 On Disappearance and Appearance — The Ephemeral in Photography, Alfred Ehrhardt Stiftung, Berlin, 2018
 Reflections: From Here to There, 2018, Gallery Taik Persons (now Persons Projects), Berlin
 New Territory: Landscape Photography Today, 2018, Denver Art Museum, Denver, USA
 The Log Lady, 2018, Fotografisk Center, Copenhagen, Denmark
 Landscapes the Masters of a Finnish School, 2018, part of Lumières Nordiques, Aabbaye de Jumièges, France

2017
 Vision of Nature, 2017/18, Kunsthaus Wien, Vienna
 The Helsinki School at Landskrona Foto Festival, 2017, Landskrona Museum, Landskrona, Sweden
 Lichtblicke | Zeitgenössische finnische Fotografie, 2017, Kunstverein KunstHaus Potsdam, Germany
 Five Finnish Photographers, 2017, Purdy Hicks Gallery, London
 Marked Sites, 2017, Gallery Taik Persons (now Persons Projects), Berlin

2015
 "I plunge into black holes and emerge intact.", 2015, Gallery Taik Persons (now Persons Projects), Berlin
 Displacement, 2015, Gallery Taik Persons (now Persons Projects), Berlin

2014
 Helsinki School of Photography in Istanbul, 2014, Gallery x-ist Istanbul
 Nine Nameless Mountains, 2014, Monopol Gallery, Warsaw

2013
 New Wave Finland: Contemporary Photography from the Helsinki School, 2013, Scandinavia House, New York
 At the End of the Rainbow - Helsinki School, 2013, Nordic Embassies, Berlin

2012
 NordLichtBilder – Vier junge Positionen der Helsinki School, 2012, Kunstverein Augsburg e.V., Holbeinhaus, Augsburg, Germany
 Helsinki Abstract, 2012, Gallery Nikolaus Ruzicska, Salzburg, Austria

2011
 The Helsinki School - A Female View, 2011/12, FOTO-RAUM, Vienna
 Helsinki School, 2011, Christophe Guye Galerie, Zurich, Switzerland
 The Helsinki School – A Female View, 2011, Purdy Hicks London
 Touching Dreams – Helsinki School Vol. 3, 2011, Det Nationale Fotomuseum, Copenhagen, Denmark

2010
 The Helsinki School at Daegu Photo Biennale: tru(E)motion, 2010, Daegu Culture & Art Center, Bongsan Culture Center, South Korea
 Helsinki10. Contemporary Photography and Video from The Helsinki School in the Statoil Art Collection, 2010, Rogaland Art Museum, Stavanger, Norway
 The Helsinki School – Seven Approaches, 2010, Bryce Wolkowitz Gallery, New York
 Helsinki School - Photography and Video NOW, 2010, Meilahti Art Museum, Helsinki

2009
 Photography Matters: The Helsinki School, 2009/10, Statoil Collection, Oslo, Norway
 Helsinki School – New Art Photography from Finland, 2009, Loft Project ETAGI, St. Petersburg, Russia
 Helsinki School Photography – Internal and External Landscape, 2009, Shiseido Gallery, Tokyo
 On Top of the Iceberg / Auf der Spitze des Eisbergs – Neue Fotografie aus Finnland, 2009, Kunstmuseum Wolfsburg, Germany

2008
 Ecole dʼ Helsinki: dialogue entre 4 générations / Helsinki School: dialogue between 4 generations, 2008, Galerie Baudoin Lebon, Paris
 Rose Boréal - Photographies de l'École d'Helsinki, 2008/09, The Palais des Beaux-Arts of Lille, France
 Helsinki By Night. Fotografie und Videokunst aus Finnland, 2008, Gallery TaiK (now Persons Projects), Berlin 
 Rose Boréal - Photographies de l'École d'Helsinki, 2008, École des Beaux-Arts, Paris

2007
 Mapping the Unknown - Fotografie aus Finnland, 2007, Overbeck-Gesellschaft Kunstverein Lübeck, Lübeck, Germany
 New Photography from TaiK, 2007, The Finnish Photography Museum, Helsinki
 Finnische Fotografie, 2007, Ludwig Museum, Koblenz, Germany
 The Helsinki School – Photography by TaiK, 2007, Purdy Hicks Gallery, London
 The Helsinki School of Photography, 2007, Stenersen Museum, Oslo, Norway

2006
 Nordic Cut – The Helsinki School of Photography, 2006, Art Pavilion, Zagreb, Croatia
 Vad är fotografi? The Helsinki School, 2006, Borås Konstmuseum, Borås, Sweden
 Dialog – The Helsinki School, 2006, Langhans Galerie, Prague
 The Helsinki School - Finnish Photography from the 21st Century, 2006, Hôtel de Ville de Bruxelles, Brussels

2005
 The Helsinki School, 2005/06, Photology Gallery, Milan, Italy
 Die Vierte Generation – The Helsinki School, 2005, Art Forum Berlin, Berlin
 The Helsinki School – A New Approach, 2005, Künstlerhaus Bethanien, Berlin
 Die Vierte Generation – The Helsinki School, 2005, PPS Galerie, Hamburg, Germany
 Personligt / Personally - Photographs from The Helsinki School, 2005, Kulturhuset, Stockholm, Sweden
 Finnish Versions - The Helsinki School, 2005, CFF (Centrum för fotografi), Stockholm, Sweden

2004
 30 by TaiK - The Helsinki School, 2004, The Finnish Museum of Photography, Helsinki
 The Helsinki School, 2004, Brandts Museet for Fotokunst, Odense, Denmark
 The Helsinki School - Photography by TaiK, 2004, Galleri Bo Bjerggaard, Copenhagen, Denmark

2003
 Fünf Positionen Finnischer Fotografie, 2003, Kunstverein Schwerte, Germany
 Fünf Positionen Finnischer Fotografie, 2003, Kunstverein Arnsberg, Germany

2002
 Northern Spell. An Exhibition of Finnish Installation Photography, 2002, University of Toronto Art Centre, Toronto, Canada
 Northern Spell: Contemporary Finnish Photography, 2002, The Embassy of Finland, Washington DC, USA

2001
 Magnetic North, 2001, The New Art Gallery Walsall, United Kingdom
 fotoFINLANDIA!, 2001, Fotografisk Center, Copenhagen, Denmark

2000 
 Finnish Photograph, 2000, Museum of Contemporary Art Kiasma, Helsinki

1999
 Tila/Espaces, 1999/2000, Maison Européenne de la Photographie, Paris

1998
 Gallery TaiK. Me, Myself and I: 20 Perspectives Mixed Media, 1998, Bensow House, Helsinki

Publications
The Helsinki School platform sustains a direct link to its former alumni by joining their works with each new generation of graduates through the publication of The Helsinki School books by Hatje Cantz, that is currently in its 6th volume. The first book under the brand name of the Helsinki School was published in 2005.
The Helsinki School Vol. 1: Photography by TaiK, 2005
The Helsinki School Vol. 2: New Photography by TaiK, 2007
The Helsinki School Vol. 3: Young Photography by TaiK, 2009
The Helsinki School Vol. 4: A Female View, 2011
The Helsinki School Vol. 5: From the Past to the Future, 2014
The Helsinki School Vol. 6: The Nature of Being, 2019

References

External links 
 Helsinki School
 The Photography department at University of Art and Design Helsinki
 Photography Now
 Article about Elina Brotherus
 The Catalogue from Hatje Cantz
 Aalto University – Official site
 Elina Brotherus: The human perspective. Brotherus presents "The Miroir" and "The Black Bay Sequence". Video by Louisiana Channel, 2012.
 Elina Brotherus: It's not me, it's a photograph. Brotherus talks about the photographs in her book "Artist and her Model". Video by Louisiana Channel, 2012.

Culture in Helsinki
Finnish artist groups and collectives